Offside is a 2000 Turkish comedy-drama film, written and directed by Serdar Akar, about a local amateur football that hopes to win the league championship. It was described by author Rekin Teksoy as having a "less innovative albeit fluent style" in comparison to the director's debut film On Board (1998).

Plot
Thirtysomething Suat still lives with his parents and works at his father's store when not practising as goalie for the local football team, Esnaf Spor. Suat is in love with Nurten, the neighbourhood beauty, but she has never responded to his many secret letters. The neighbourhood's greatest wish is for Esnaf Spor to win the amateur league championship.

Cast
Müjde Ar as Aynur 
Savaş Dinçel as Hacı 
Uğur Polat as Cem 
Rafet El Roman as Serkan 
Şahnaz Çakıralp as Nurten 
Erkan Can as Suat
Fatih Akyol as Selçuk

References

External links 

Turkish comedy-drama films
2000 films
2000s Turkish-language films
Association football films
2000 comedy-drama films
Films set in Turkey